A filly is a female horse that is too young to be called a mare. There are two specific definitions in use:

In most cases, a filly is a female horse under four years old.
In some nations, such as the United Kingdom and the United States, the world of horse racing sets the cutoff age for fillies as five.

Fillies are sexually mature by two and are sometimes bred at that age, but generally, they should not be bred until they themselves have stopped growing, usually by four or five.  Some fillies may exhibit estrus as yearlings. 

The equivalent term for a male is a colt. When horses of either sex are less than one year, they are referred to as foals. Horses of either sex between one and two years old may be called yearlings.

See also

 Filly Triple Crown
 Weanling

References

Types of horse
Female horses